The Norge brand of appliances was originally manufactured by the Norge Appliance Company, which was once a division of BorgWarner and later a division of Fedders.  The Norge name was acquired in 1979 by Magic Chef, which in turn was absorbed by Maytag in 1986. Since 2006, Maytag is a part of Whirlpool Corporation.

Popular culture 
 Dan Aykroyd portrayed a Norge repairman on Saturday Night Live.

References

Further reading
 The Norge Rollator

 
Maytag brands